The 1977–78 Magyar Kupa (English: Hungarian Cup) was the 38th season of Hungary's annual knock-out cup football competition.

Final

See also
 1977–78 Nemzeti Bajnokság I

References

External links
 Official site 
 soccerway.com

1977–78 in Hungarian football
1977–78 domestic association football cups
1977-78